Windsor is an unincorporated community in Stoney Creek Township, Randolph County, in the U.S. state of Indiana.

History
Windsor was laid out in 1832. The community most likely was named after Windsor Castle. A post office was established at Windsor in 1831, and remained in operation until it was discontinued in 1898.

Geography

References

Unincorporated communities in Randolph County, Indiana
Unincorporated communities in Indiana